Jin Boyang (born 3 October 1997) is a Chinese figure skater. He is a two-time World bronze medalist (2016–2017), the 2018 Four Continents champion, a two-time Four Continents silver medalist (2016, 2019), the 2017 Asian Winter Games silver medalist, and a six-time (2014–2017, 2019, 2022) Chinese national champion. On the junior level, he is the 2015 World Junior silver medalist and the 2013 JGP Final champion. He is the first Chinese skater to medal in the men's singles at the World Figure Skating Championships.

Jin is the first skater ever to land a quad Lutz-triple toe loop combination in competition, the first skater to ever have landed three different types of quads in a single competition, the first skater to have landed four quad jumps in a single program in international competition, and the first skater to have landed six quads in international competition. He is credited as being one of the people who fueled the "revolution" based around quadruple jumps in figure skating.

Personal life 
Jin was born on 3 October 1997, in Harbin, China. His parents formerly competed in middle to long-distance running. Jin enrolled at the Harbin Institute of Physical Education in 2013.  In 2019, he enrolled for a Master's Degree at Beijing Sport University. His family name Jin means "gold", and he is called "Golden Boy" by some media sources. 

He likes pets, electronics, music, the internet, remote-controlled cars, car racing, and collecting shoes. He enjoys go-karting, motorcycling, and skiing, but avoids them to prevent injury during training.

Career

Early years 
Jin started skating at age seven and a half, having become interested in the activity when he attended one of Shen Xue and Zhao Hongbo's ice shows. His first coach was Wang Junxiang. He began to demonstrate his talents in skating during his second year of primary school. He took ballet, Latin dances, jazz, and street dance classes before he started focusing on competitive skating. He landed his first triple axel in May 2010.

Junior career

2011–12 season 
Jin won the junior division of the Asian Open Trophy 2011 by "a landslide". He earned a total of 177.17 points; if he were competing in the senior men's division, he would have come in second place. His feet were so small that he had to wear girls' skates with black boot covers because there were no men's skating boots in his size.

2012–2013 season: Junior Grand Prix debut
Jin debuted on the Junior Grand Prix (JGP) series in the 2012–2013 season. After taking gold in France and silver in Slovenia, he finished fifth  at the JGP Final, held in Sochi, Russia. He won a bronze medal at the 2013 Chinese Championships, and placed fourth at the 2013 World Junior Championships in Milan, Italy.

2013–2014 season: Junior Grand Prix Final gold and first senior National title

In the 2013–14 JGP series, Jin won his assignments in Latvia and Estonia and then obtained gold at the JGP Final in Fukuoka, Japan. He won his first senior national title at the 2014 Chinese Championships. He finished sixth at the 2014 World Junior Championships in Sofia, Bulgaria.

2014–2015 season: Silver medal at Junior Worlds
Jin won both of his Junior Grand Prix events in Slovenia and Japan, and was the top qualifier for the Junior Grand Prix Final held in Barcelona, Spain, where he placed second after the short program. However, a fifth-place free skate left him in fourth overall. He won his second national title at the 2015 Chinese Championships. Jin concluded his season with a silver medal at the 2015 World Junior Championships in Tallinn, Estonia, having placed fifth in the short program and first in the free skate.

Senior career

2015–2016 season: Senior international debut and bronze medal at Worlds

A video of Jin landing a quadruple Lutz triple Toe Loop combination in practice was circulated. During a national event early in the season, Jin completed this jumping pass in his short program and landed four quadruple jumps in his free skate, although with a step-out on the quad Lutz, completing six quadruple jumps in competition.
Jin received two 2015 Grand Prix assignments. At the 2015 Cup of China, he won the silver medal behind reigning World champion Javier Fernández. He became the first person to ever land a quad lutz triple toe combination in competition and also the first to land a quad lutz with a positive GOE in international competition. He was also the first person to attempt four quadruple jumps in one program.  He set a record for the most points scored on one element, with the jump combination in the short program scoring 19.19 points.

At the 2015 NHK Trophy, Jin took silver behind reigning Olympic champion Yuzuru Hanyu, thus qualifying for the 2015 Grand Prix Final in Barcelona, where he finished fifth. At the 13th National Winter Games of China, he represented the city of Harbin and finished first in both short program and free skate, completing all of his planned quadruple jumps.

Making his Four Continents debut in Taipei, Jin landed a total of six quadruple jumps in his programs and achieved new personal bests in his short program, free skate, and combined total scores. With a quad lutz, quad salchow, and two quad toe loops in his free skate, he also became the first skater to land three kinds of quads in a single program as well as becoming the first person to land four quads in a single program in international competition, and ultimately placed second overall behind Canada's Patrick Chan by a narrow difference of 0.38 points.

At the 2016 World Championships in Boston, Jin won the bronze medal and became the first Chinese man to medal in men's singles at the World Championships.

2016–2017 season: Second bronze at Worlds 
Jin placed fifth at the 2016 Skate America and won silver at the 2016 Cup of China. He ranked seventh in the series standings and thus did not qualify for the 2016–2017 Grand Prix Final. Later in the season, at the Chinese National Championships, Jin placed second in the short program but rebounded in the free, and was able to win his fourth straight national title. He was assigned to both the 2017 Four Continents Championships and the 2017 Asian Winter Games, where he finished 5th and 2nd, respectively.	

Jin repeated as world bronze medalist at the 2017 World Championships in Helsinki, achieving new personal bests in his short, free, and overall combined total scores. Finishing behind Hanyu and Uno, Jin was a part of the first All-Asian Men’s podium at a World Championship.

2017–2018 season: First senior international gold and Olympic debut 

Jin had a car accident in August 2017, resulting in left thigh injuries. He started his season at the 2017 CS Finlandia Trophy. He placed second in the short program and third in the free skate and won the gold medal overall. His Grand Prix assignments for this season were 2017 Cup of China and 2017 Skate America. Jin interviewed that he had sprained both of his ankles due to loose boot laces, which was confirmed by Zhao Hongbo as having happened before Cup of China. He placed second at Cup of China and fourth at Skate America. He withdrew from the Grand Prix Final and the Chinese Championships due to the injuries.

At 2018 Four Continents, his first competition post-injury, Jin surpassed 100 points in the short program for the first time internationally, with a score of 100.17. In the free skate he scored 200.78 points, for an overall score of 300.95, surpassing the 200 and 300 point barrier once again and winning the gold medal over 2017 World silver medalist Shoma Uno, and won his first senior international gold medal at an ISU Championship. His quad Lutz in the Long Program received 2.71 GOE, with six judges awarding it maximum GOE, for a total element score of 16.31. He interviewed that he'd worked hard on recovery after he'd withdrawn from the Grand Prix Final, and that he'd trained the hardest he ever had, and that the result had given him the confidence to challenge himself towards delivering two perfect performances in Pyeongchang.

Jin placed fourth at the 2018 Winter Olympics, only 7.47 points behind third place finisher Javier Fernández. His placement is the highest of any Chinese athlete competing in men's single skating in Olympic history so far. At the 2018 World Championships, he placed fourth in the short program but dropped to nineteenth overall after ranking twenty-third in the free skate.

2018–2019 season 

Over the summer, it was initially announced that Jin would be moving to train with Brian Orser and Tracy Wilson at the Toronto Cricket, Skating & Curling Club in preparation for the 2022 Winter Olympics in Beijing. However, these plans were subsequently called off, with Shen Xue stating on behalf of the Chinese Skating Association that Jin was "more familiar with the training environment and methods in China."

Debuting on the Grand Prix series for the season, Jin placed fifth at the 2018 Grand Prix of Helsinki and ninth at the 2018 Internationaux de France. After winning the Chinese national title again, he competed at the 2019 Four Continents Championships, where he placed third in the short program and second in the free skate, winning the silver medal overall.  Finishing the season at the 2019 World Championships in Saitama, Jin placed ninth in the short program after falling on his quad Lutz attempt but rose to fifth overall after a strong free skate.  Jin called his performance in the second half of the season a great improvement on the first half.

2019–2020 season: First senior Grand Prix gold 
Jin opened his season with a win at the 2019 CS Lombardia Trophy, surpassing the 100-point barrier for the SP for the first time under the +5 system, with 101.09 points.  He was less successful at the 2019 Shanghai Trophy, placing third with a strong free skate after a weak showing in the short. At his first Grand Prix assignment, 2019 Skate America, Jin placed ninth in the short program after doubling a planned quad Lutz and fall on his triple Axel.  He placed fifth with a stronger free skate, moving up to sixth place overall.  At his second Grand Prix, the 2019 Cup of China, Jin again fell on his quad Lutz in the short program and narrowly placed second behind a returning Yan Han.  He then won the free skate, landing two quads but doubling a quad toe loop, taking his first ever Grand Prix gold medal and winning the Cup of China after three consecutive silver medals.

His performances were enough to qualify for the 2019–20 Grand Prix of Figure Skating Final for the third time in his career, and he was able to attend for the first time since the 2015–16 Grand Prix Final. At the Final, he popped his opening quad, Lutz, finishing sixth in the short program. He also struggled in the free skate, falling twice, but rose to fifth overall.

At the 2020 Four Continents Championships, Jin landed all his jumps to place second after the short program.  In the free skate, he doubled two of his attempted quads, though successfully landing the quad Lutz again, and dropped to fourth overall.  Although Jin was assigned to compete at the World Championships in Montreal, these were cancelled as a result of the coronavirus pandemic.

2020–2021 season 
With the 2020–21 figure skating season having to deal with the COVID-19 pandemic, senior skaters were invited to a maximum of one Grand Prix event, based largely on geographic location. Jin was invited to the 2020 Cup of China. He won the competition with a clean short program and a long program that had the highest technical difficulty of the competitors despite a couple of errors. He challenged himself technically as well as artistically, choosing short program music that had a slower tempo than before.

Throughout the season, there were multiple clips of Jin video training with Brian Orser and Tracy Wilson. Before the 2021 World Championships, his biography was updated to reflect their addition to his coaching team. Jin finished in twenty-second place at the World Championships. The combined placement of Yan Han, and Jin wasn't enough to qualify more than one spot for the 2022 Winter Olympics in Beijing.

2021–2022 season: Beijing Olympics 
During the closed-loop training, Jin began to train by himself, because the conditions did not make it possible for his coach, who suffered from diabetes, to be with him every time. He was assigned to the 2021 Cup of China as his only Grand Prix event of the season. He was noted to be increasing his physical fitness and doing special training according to the "program arranged by the coaching staff and outside experts". After the 2021 Cup of China was cancelled, he was reassigned to its replacement event, the 2021 Gran Premio d'Italia. He was assigned to participate in the Olympic test event, the 2021 Asian Open Trophy. Sometime before the competition, he contracted appendicitis and decided to put off surgery in favor of conservative treatment, with participation in the 2022 Winter Olympics in mind. He won the bronze medal. He placed first in the short program in Gran Premio d'Italia but dropped to seventh place after a problematic free skate.

It was announced that China's competitor in the men's discipline would be decided based on the results of five trials. Jin maintained a lead over Chen Yudong in all five rounds, and accumulated enough points to be announced as the Olympic entry for China.

Jin began the Olympic games as the Chinese entry in the men's short program of the Olympic team event. He placed sixth in the segment, securing five points for the Chinese team. After the short programs concluded, Team China qualified for the long program segment with an accumulated 22 points. Jin placed fourth with his free skate, taking another seven points. Team China finished fifth overall after the long programs concluded, with 50 points total.

For the men's event, Jin scored a total of 90.98 points in the short program, with both quads landed, but with a mistake on the triple Axel. He remarked that his team leaders had helped him adjust internally and that it was "great" to skate at such a technical level. In the free skate, Jin landed all three of his planned quads, and every other jump apart from an error on his triple flip, setting a new personal best technical score of 97.23. He earned a score of 179.45, and a total of 270.43. He finished ninth overall. He interviewed that he felt relieved and encouraged for having overcome the ups and downs of the previous four years, further adding that he was in a relaxed state during the competition. He felt he had achieved his goals and shown his best side, which was memorable as an athlete from the host country.

2022–2023 season 

After the Beijing Olympics, Jin interviewed that he wished to "represent China and let everyone know that there is still a person fighting in men's singles" for "the next four years". He also felt the responsibility to encourage more children to participate in figure skating and make more people love the sport. It was announced that Jin's new coaches would be Brian Orser and Tracy Wilson, after he'd been unable to go for face-to-face coaching with them at the Toronto Cricket, Skating and Curling Club previously. He was assigned to the 2022 Skate Canada International and 2022 NHK Trophy as his Grand Prix events of the season, however, he withdrew from both events, citing injury.

Jin competed at the 2023 Four Continents Championships, placing fourth in the short program with a clean skate. He revealed that he had continued to struggle with injury and health concerns, including two bouts of COVID in recent months, but that he was enthusiastic about how his new coaching team was managing the situation, calling this "a brand new start." He dropped to seventh place after the free skate, indicating that he had been dealing with pain while at the event that limited his jump practice.

Skating technique 
Jin is known for his technical prowess and quadruple jumps, earning him the nickname "Mars Boy" (火星男孩) from some Chinese media. During the 2016–17 season, Jin said in an interview, "Jumps define me and I like them."  He is regarded as one of the driving forces behind the dramatic "quad revolution" in men's skating that eventually took over single skating as a whole, with some crediting him as being the person who started it. He is sometimes referred to as "Quad King".

His quad Lutz and quad Lutz-triple Toe Loop combination are both consistently described as "famous", "massive", "beautiful", "huge", and "stunning".
He likes all jumps.

Records and achievements
 The first skater to ever land a quadruple lutz-triple toe loop combination in a competition.
 The first skater to have landed six quadruple jumps in any ISU competition.
 The first skater to have landed four quadruple jumps in a single program in an international competition (2016 4CCs Free Skate).
 The first skater to ever have landed three different types of quadruple jumps in a single competition (2016 4CCs).
 The first skater ever to have done a quadruple Lutz at World Championships (2016 World Championships).
 The first Chinese World medalist in Men’s singles.

Programs

Competitive highlights
GP: Grand Prix; CS: Challenger Series; JGP: Junior Grand Prix

Detailed results
Small medals for short program and free skating are awarded only at ISU Championships. At team events, medals are awarded for team results only. ISU personal bests are highlighted in bold.

Senior level

Junior level

References

External links

 
 
 

Chinese male single skaters
Figure skaters at the 2017 Asian Winter Games
Asian Games medalists in figure skating
Medalists at the 2017 Asian Winter Games
Asian Games silver medalists for China
1997 births
Living people
Figure skaters from Harbin
Figure skaters at the 2018 Winter Olympics
Figure skaters at the 2022 Winter Olympics
Olympic figure skaters of China
World Junior Figure Skating Championships medalists
Four Continents Figure Skating Championships medalists
World Figure Skating Championships medalists